The Middelburg Tigers are a South African professional rugby league club based in Middelburg, Mpumalanga. The first competed in the 2011-12 season representing the Mpumalanga Panthers, with the Ermelo Tomahawks at the time. In the 2013-14 season, they became the runners-up to the TUKS Rugby League club.

See also
Rhino Cup
TUKS Rugby League

References

External links

Rugby league in South Africa
Rugby league teams
Rugby clubs established in 2005